MayWish (Hangul: 메이위시) is a South Korean girl group under J9 Entertainment. The group consist of four members: Anna, Jelly, HyoIn and SoEun. They debuted with their 1st single album "Hello" on October 17, 2018.

History

2018-Present: Debut with Hello 

On October 17, 2018, Maywish released their 1st single album "Hello". On November 20, 2018, they performed their 1st debut stage on SBS MTV's music show "The Show". On December 19, 2018, Maywish won their first award "Best Dance Award" at 2018 Green Earth G-Show Music Award.

Members 
 Anna (Hangul: 안나) - Leader, Sub Vocalist
 Jelly (Hangul: 제령) - Sub Vocalist
 HyoIn (Hangul: 효인) - Main Vocalist
 SoEun (Hangul 소은) - Maknae, Main Dancer, Sub Vocalist

Discography

Single albums

Singles

Filmography

Music videos

Reality Shows

Awards and nominations

Green Earth G-Show Music Award 

|-
| 2018
| Maywish
| Best Dance Award
|

References

External links
 Facebook

South Korean girl groups
South Korean dance music groups
Musical groups established in 2018
K-pop music groups
Musical groups from Seoul
2018 establishments in South Korea
South Korean pop music groups
Musical quintets